The Genesee Wesleyan Seminary was the name of two institutions located on the same site in Lima, New York.

The Genesee Wesleyan Seminary (I) was founded in 1831 by the Genesee Annual Conference of the Methodist Episcopal Church.  The plan for its establishment dates to 1829 when the Conference appointed a committee for this purpose. In 1849, there was a substantive attempt to upgrade the institution to a truly college-level entity, and Genesee College was created to replace the seminary. By the end of the Civil War, the location at Lima was seen as too limiting, and plans by civic leaders in Syracuse for a new university in that city led to the removal of Genesee College to Syracuse in 1870, where it became the basis of Syracuse University.

The facilities at Lima remained open as the second Genesee Wesleyan Seminary (II) from 1870 through to 1941. Although vacant through the war years, in 1947, Genesee Junior College opened in the grounds in 1947, again under the auspices of the Methodist Episcopal Church.
The junior college closed in 1951. The Elim Bible Institute has operated on the grounds since that time. Two seminary / college buildings were listed on the National Register of Historic Places in 1976.

Genesee Wesleyan Seminary (I) 

The Rev. Dr. Samuel Luckey was elected the first Principal of the Genesee Wesleyan Seminary, and was transferred from the New York Annual Conference of the M.E. Church to the Genesee Conference.  He remained in this office until 1836, when he was elected by the M.E. General Conference as the Editor of The Christian Advocate and Journal, an important denominational periodical.

The institution is said to have "opened most favorably," with a total enrollment the first year (1831–32) of 341, with 170-180 students attending at any one time.  The Agents of the seminary solicited funds for the erection of handsome buildings. In 1880, Bishop Matthew Simpson of the M.E. Church described the seminary's early years thus "no other institution in the church accomplishing apparently more in the education of active and useful young men and young women."

The early years of the institution were said to be ones of "great prosperity."  This was especially true under the administrations of the Rev. Schuyler Seager. Seager was born 8 July 1807 in Simsbury, Connecticut. He joined the Genesee Conference in 1833.  He graduated from Wesleyan University in 1836.  That same year he was appointed Teacher of Moral Science and Belles-Lettres in the Genesee Wesleyan Seminary.  He was chosen as Principal of the seminary in 1837.  After entering pastoral ministry in 1844, he returned to the seminary in 1854, again as Principal.  In 1856-57 he was made Principal of the Genesee Model School in Lima, New York, an offshoot of the seminary.

Notable alumni 
Anna Smeed Benjamin (1834-1924), social reformer
Adolphus W. Burtt, South Dakota Attorney General
George H. Durand, served in the United States Congress for the state of Michigan.
Mary Galentine Fenner (1839-1903), poet and litterateur
Charles Henry Fowler, President of Northwestern University from 1873-1876.
Merton W. Herrick (November 19, 1834 – March 24, 1907), member of the Wisconsin State Assembly.
Kenneth Keating, US Senator and ambassador
Henry A. Patterson, member of the Wisconsin State Assembly.
Henry Jarvis Raymond  (January 24, 1820 - June 18, 1869), journalist and politician who was a founder of The New York Times, attended Geneva Wesleyan Seminary.
Sarah Amelia Scull (1834–1913), respected Greek scholar and author of Greek Mythology Systematized, who became one of the leading Greek scholars in the world during her time. and Catalogue on Greek Art.

Genesee College

In 1850 it was resolved to enlarge the institution from a seminary into a college, or to connect a college with the seminary. The Rev. Dr. Benjamin Franklin Tefft was elected President of this endeavor.  The name was chosen as Genesee College.  However, the location was thought by many not to be sufficiently central.  It was resolved, therefore, to remove the college to Syracuse, New York, to become the nucleus of Syracuse University). The college, its libraries, the students and faculty, and the college's two fraternity chapters all relocated to Syracuse.

Notable alumni
Belva Ann Lockwood (October 24, 1830 – May 19, 1917) was an American attorney, politician, educator and author.

Genesee Wesleyan Seminary (II)

After the removal of Genesee College, a seminary was again operated on the grounds. There is likely some dispute as to which institution was continued where. There may have been some intent to preserve a full college at Lima by those who did not support the move to Syracuse. There have also been claims that the seminary after 1870 was simply a continuation of the first seminary, (this article separates the two institutions more for clarity rather than to take a definitive position on the question). Genesee Wesleyan seminary flourished under the presidency of the Rev. G.H. Bridgeman, as reported by Bishop Simpson. At that time, it had large and commodious buildings, and all the facilities of a first-class seminary. The institution did not survive the early World War II years.

References

Further reading 
 Simpson, Matthew. Cyclopaedia of Methodism (rev. ed.). Philadelphia: Louis H. Everts, 1880.
 Beadie, Nancy. Education and the Creation of Capital in the Early American Republic. New York: Cambridge University Press, 2010.

History of Methodism in the United States
Syracuse University
United Methodist seminaries
Educational institutions established in 1831
Education in Livingston County, New York
Defunct private universities and colleges in New York (state)
1831 establishments in New York (state)
1870 disestablishments in New York (state)